Windmills of Your Mind is an album by the saxophonist Bud Shank recorded in 1969 for the Pacific Jazz label. The album features music by Michel Legrand who also provided the arrangements.

Reception

In a review for JazzWax, Marc Myers wrote that, on the album, Shank "wasn't turning on or selling out. Instead, his hard sound and all-out blowing on alto sax and flute gave the music a speeding-MG, mid-life crisis sophistication. On Windmills of Your Mind, he fed Michel Legrand's jazz-based pop melodies through the Bud Shank jazz grinder, resisting the temptation to convert the film tunes into adult contemporary fare."

A reviewer for The Skeptical Audiophile stated: "If you love hearing INTO a recording, actually being able to 'see' the performers, and feeling as if you are sitting in the studio with Shank, this is the record for you. It's what vintage all analog recordings are known for — this sound."

Track listing
All compositions by Michel Legrand, except as indicated 
 "The Windmills of Your Mind" (Legrand, Alan Bergman, Marilyn Bergman) - 3:09
 "Watch What Happens" (Legrand, Norman Gimbel) - 4:01
 "Theme d'Elise" - 3:44
 "One Day" (Legrand, Bergman, Bergman) - 4:56
 "Chanson de Solange" (Legrand, Jacques Demy) - 2:52
 "De Delphine a Lancien" (Legrand, Demy) - 3:16
 "I Will Wait for You" (Legrand, Gimbel) - 3:27
 "His Eyes, Her Eyes" (Legrand, Bergman, Bergman) - 4:22
 "Once Upon a Summertime" (Legrand, Johnny Mercer, Eddie Barclay Eddy Marnay) - 3:28
 "Chanson des Jumelles" (Legrand, Demy) - 1:52

Personnel 
Bud Shank - alto saxophone, flute
Gary Barone, Bud Brisbois, Conte Candoli - trumpet
Billy Byers - trombone
Ernie Watts - tenor saxophone
Michel Legrand - piano, harpsichord, arranger 
Artie Kane - electronic organ
Howard Roberts - guitar
Ray Brown - double bass
Shelly Manne - drums

References 

1969 albums
Pacific Jazz Records albums
Bud Shank albums
Albums arranged by Michel Legrand